Elena Karina Byrne is a poet, visual artist, teacher and editor. Her poem "Irregular Masks" was featured in The Best American Poetry 2005 and her poem "Berryman's Concordance Against This Silence" received a Pushcart Prize in 2008 for which she has been nominated eleven times.

She was a regional director of the Poetry Society of America for twelve years. Byrne has curated poetry readings at the Ruskin Art Club in Los Angeles, and at the Los Angeles Times Festival of Books. Her work has appeared in The Paris Review.

She is the daughter of American artist Herbert Jepson.

Books
The Flammable Bird Lincoln, Neb. : Zoo Press :  2002. , 
Masque Dorset, Vt. : Tupelo Press, 2008. , 
Squander,  Richmond, California : Omnidawn Publishing, 2016. , 
The Fable Language (forthcoming)
Voyeur Hour (forthcoming)
Beautiful Insignificance (forthcoming)

References

External links
 

21st-century American poets
Living people
American women poets
21st-century American women writers
Year of birth missing (living people)